Harald Czudaj (born 14 February 1963) is a German former bobsledder who competed during the 1990s. He competed in three Winter Olympics and won a gold medal in the four-man event at Lillehammer in 1994.

Czudaj also won four medals at the FIBT World Championships with two silvers (Two-man and four-man: both 1990 for East Germany) and two bronzes (Four-man: 1991, 1995, both for Germany). He also won the 1997-98 Bobsleigh World Cup championship in the four-man event.

Prior to the 1992 Winter Olympics, he came under fire for working as an informer for the Stasi, submitting at least ten reports on his teammates when he was with SV Dynamo in Altenberg, East Germany between 1988 and 1990. Czudaj was allowed to compete following investigation by German sports authorities.

At the 2006 Winter Olympics, Czudaj was a coach for the Dutch women's bobsleigh team.

References

 Bobsleigh two-man world championship medalists since 1931
 Bobsleigh four-man world championship medalists since 1930
 DatabaseOlympics.com profile
 Four-man bobsleigh Winter Olympic results: 1988-2002.
 List of four-man bobsleigh World Cup champions since 1985

1963 births
Living people
People from Wermsdorf
People from Bezirk Leipzig
German male bobsledders
Sportspeople from Saxony
Olympic bobsledders of Germany
Bobsledders at the 1992 Winter Olympics
Bobsledders at the 1994 Winter Olympics
Bobsledders at the 1998 Winter Olympics
Olympic gold medalists for Germany
Olympic medalists in bobsleigh
Medalists at the 1994 Winter Olympics
People of the Stasi